Six of ships of the French Navy have been named in honour of the region of Brittany.

Ships named Bretagne 
 , a 110-gun three-decker ship of the line
 , a 130-gun steam and sail three-decker 
 , a 90-gun , was renamed Bretagne when she replaced the 1855 Bretagne as a school ship.
 , a 90-gun , was renamed Bretagne when she replaced the ex-Ville de Bordeaux as a school ship.
 , a battleship, lead ship of her class, sunk at Mers-el-Kebir
 A FREMM frigate

See also 
 , an 1886 ocean liner for Compagnie Générale Transatlantique
 , a 1951 ocean liner; rechristened SS Brittany in 1962. Destroyed by fire in 1963
  - several ships named Bretagne

Notes and references

Notes

References

Bibliography 
 

French Navy ship names